KAMU-TV (channel 12) is a PBS member television station licensed to College Station, Texas, United States. Owned by Texas A&M University, it is a sister station to NPR member KAMU-FM (90.9). The two stations share studios at the Moore Communications Center on the university's campus; KAMU-TV's transmitter is located at adjacent Hensel Park. KAMU-TV serves as the sole PBS member station for the Waco–Temple–Bryan market.

History
KAMU-TV began broadcasting on February 15, 1970. It originally aired on UHF channel 15, and was the first educational station in central Texas.

 
On April 1, 2003, KAMU was the first station in the region to begin broadcasting in HDTV. KAMU made the first live HDTV broadcast in the region on April 22, 2004, with the program Meet the Candidates 2004.

On February 27, 2018, Central Texas College's board of trustees voted to close down KNCT (which served the western third of the Waco–Temple–Bryan market, including Waco and Killeen) over budgetary concerns related to the FCC spectrum repacking that would have required that station to move from RF channel 46 to RF channel 17 starting in 2020, as well as the need to replace its original transmitter. The shutdown of KNCT, which would occur on August 31, 2018, would leave KAMU-TV as the only PBS member station in the market. However, most cable systems on the western side of the market opted to import KLRU from Austin, which had already served as the default PBS member station for the market's southwestern areas.

Technical information

Subchannels
The station's digital signal is multiplexed:

Analog-to-digital conversion
KAMU's broadcasts became digital-only, effective June 12, 2009. It opted not to use PSIP to remap to channel 15, instead opting to use channel 12 as its virtual channel. KAMU offered ResearchChannel on subchannel 12.3 until that service was discontinued in August 2010.

See also 
List of television stations in Texas
Channel 12 digital TV stations in the United States
Channel 12 virtual TV stations in the United States

References

External links 
 
KAMU-TV Watch live

Texas A&M University
PBS member stations
Television channels and stations established in 1970
Television stations in Texas
1970 establishments in Texas